Yoruba Richen (born 1972, in New York City, New York) is an American film director, screenwriter and producer.  Her work has been featured on PBS, New York Times Op Doc, Frontline Digital, New York Magazine’s website -The Cut, The Atlantic and Field of Vision.  Her film The Green Book: Guide to Freedom was broadcast on the Smithsonian Channel to record audiences and was awarded the Henry Hampton Award for Excellence in Documentary Filmmaking.

Work
Richen produced and directed The New Black (2013), which won the audience award at AFI Docs, Frameline Film Festival and Philly Q Fest. It also won best documentary at Urbanworld Film Festival. The New Black was nominated for an NAACP Image Award and a GLAAD Media Award for Outstanding Documentary.

Her film Promised Land received a Diverse Voices Co-Production fund award from the Corporation for Public Broadcasting and was broadcast on PBS's POV in 2010. In 2007, she won a Fulbright award in filmmaking and traveled to Brazil, where she began production on Sisters of the Good Death, a documentary about the oldest African women's association in the Americas and the annual festival they hold celebrating the end of slavery. Yoruba  won a Clio award for her short film about the Grammy-nominated singer Andra Day.

Richen has also won Creative Promise Award at Tribeca All Access and was a Sundance Producers Fellow. She is a featured TED Speaker, a Fulbright fellow, a Guggenheim fellow and a 2016 recipient of the Chicken & Egg Breakthrough Filmmaker Award. Richen was chosen for the Root 100s list of African Americans 45 years old and younger who are responsible for the year’s most significant moments and themes. She is the Founding Director of the Documentary Program at the Craig Newmark Graduate School of Journalism at CUNY.

Education and early career
Richen is a graduate of Brown University, and lived in San Francisco for a time before moving back to New York City, where she worked for ABC News as an associate producer for the investigative unit of ABC News as well as a producer for the independent news program Democracy Now!.

Filmography

See also
 LGBT culture in New York City
 List of female film and television directors
 List of lesbian filmmakers
 List of LGBT-related films directed by women
 List of LGBT people from New York City

References

Further reading

External links
 
 Yoruba Richen at TEDTalk
 Yoruba Richen interview with Katie Halper, The Katie Halper Show, WBAI
 The New Black official website

1972 births
Living people
American documentary filmmakers
American women screenwriters
African-American film directors
African-American film producers
African-American screenwriters
American lesbian artists
LGBT film directors
LGBT producers
American LGBT screenwriters
American women documentary filmmakers
Film producers from New York (state)
Film directors from New York City
Brown University alumni
CUNY Graduate School of Journalism faculty
21st-century African-American people
21st-century African-American women
20th-century African-American people
20th-century African-American women
African-American women writers
Fulbright alumni